Loris Tinelli (born 2 February 1999) is a Luxembourgian footballer who plays as a midfielder or winger and currently play for YSCC Yokohama.

Career

As a youth player, Tinelli joined the youth academy of Luxembourgian second tier side Kayl-Tétange. In 2015, he joined the youth academy of Anderlecht in the Belgian top flight. In 2018, Tinelli signed for Belgian club Virton. In 2019, he signed for Racing (Luxembourg) in Luxembourg, helping them win the 2021–22 Luxembourg Cup. 

In 2022, he signed for Japanese team YSCC Yokohama. On 11 September 2022, Tinelli debuted for YSCC Yokohama during a 0–4 loss to SC Sagamihara. On 25 September 2022, he scored his first goal YSCC Yokohama during a 1–0 win over Matsumoto Yamaga FC.On 21 November 2022, he won the award for the best goal scorer of the year in the 2022 season.

Career Statistics

Club
.

Honours
 Individual
 J3 League Goal of the Year : 2022

References

External links

 

1999 births
Association football midfielders
Association football wingers
Expatriate footballers in Belgium
Expatriate footballers in Japan
J3 League players
Living people
Luxembourg National Division players
Luxembourg youth international footballers
Luxembourgian expatriate footballers
Luxembourgian expatriate sportspeople in Belgium
Luxembourgian expatriate sportspeople in Japan
Luxembourgian footballers
Luxembourgian people of Italian descent
Racing FC Union Luxembourg players
YSCC Yokohama players